Everage is both a given name and a surname. Notable people with the name include:

 Everage Richardson (born 1985), American-Icelandic basketball player
 Dame Edna Everage

See also
 Average
 Beverage